Chris Witaske (born June 12, 1983) is an American actor, best known for his portrayal of Chris Czajkowski in the Netflix romantic comedy Love.

Life and career
Witaske was born in St. Charles, Illinois. He began taking classes at Second City in Chicago as a teenager and also performed as a birthday party magician before focusing mainly on comedy and acting. Witaske attended St. Charles High School and after graduation, he commenced his studies at the University of Iowa where he majored in Theater Arts. He then moved to Chicago and worked at comedy venues including the Second City, iO, and Annoyance Theaters before moving to Los Angeles.

In 2014, Witaske made his television acting debut in the Fox comedy-drama series New Girl. Following on from his first role, Witaske won other roles on a variety of TV shows and films including The Comeback, Teachers, Drunk History, Lady Bird, Unicorn Store, What Men Want, Arrested Development, Weird City, The Wrong Missy and The Bear (TV series)

In 2016, Witaske was cast as Chris Czajkowski in the Netflix romantic comedy Love. Witaske was later promoted to a series regular role the following year.

In July 2021, it was announced that Netflix had greenlit the adult animated series Chicago Party Aunt, created by Witaske with Jon Barinholtz and Katie Rich and based on the Twitter account Witaske created of the same name. The series started airing on September 21, 2021.

As of 2022, Witaske is slated to produce a historical fiction series by Shermann Thomas for Netflix.

Filmography

Film

Television

References

External links
 

1983 births
Living people
Male actors from Illinois
American male television actors
American male film actors